Addi Shihu is a reservoir located in the Atsbi Wenberta woreda of the Tigray Region in Ethiopia. The earthen dam that holds the reservoir was built in 1997 by SAERT.

Dam characteristics 
 Dam height: 10.8 metres
 Dam crest length: 301 metres

Capacity 
 Original capacity: 1 million m³
 Reservoir area: 36 ha

Irrigation 
 Designed irrigated area: 40 ha
 Actual irrigated area in 2002: 13 ha

Environment 
The catchment of the reservoir is 9.4 km² large. The reservoir suffers from rapid siltation. Part of the water that could be used for irrigation is lost through seepage; the positive side-effect is that this contributes to groundwater recharge.

Homonymous places 
The town of Addi Shihu, in Alaje woreda is located more than 100 km to the south.

References 

1997 establishments in Ethiopia

Reservoirs in Ethiopia
Tigray Region